The angular artery is an artery of the face. It is the terminal part of the facial artery. It ascends to the medial angle of the eye's orbit. It is accompanied by the angular vein. It ends by anastomosing with the dorsal nasal branch of the ophthalmic artery. It supplies the lacrimal sac, the orbicularis oculi muscle, and the outer side of the nose.

Structure 
The angular artery is the terminal part of the facial artery. It ascends to the medial angle of the eye's orbit (the medial canthus). It is embedded in the fibers of the angular head of the levator labii superioris muscle. It is accompanied by the angular vein. On the cheek, it distributes branches which anastomose with the infraorbital artery. It ends by anastomosing with the dorsal nasal branch of the ophthalmic artery.

Function 
The angular artery supplies the lacrimal sac, most of the outer side of the nose, part of the lower eyelid, and the orbicularis oculi muscle.

Clinical significance 
The angular artery is important in a nasolabial skin flap for reconstructive surgery. It can be put at risk during acupuncture of skin around the inner side of the eye.

Additional images

References

External links 
 Diagram at stchas.edu

Arteries of the head and neck